The Type 67 Model 30 Rocket Artillery (67式30型ロケット弾発射機 roku-go-shiki-san-jyu-gata-roketto-dan-hassha-ki) was a self-propelled rocket launcher in service in the Japan Ground Self-Defense Force.

Description 
The Type 67 is a pair of rocket rails mounted on a Hino Motors ZC-series truck. Each rocket has a calibre of 337mm and a length of 4.5 metres (14.76 feet).

See also
MGR-3 Little John
BM-21 Grad
BMD-20
Light Artillery Rocket System (West Germany)

References 

Rocket artillery
Japan Ground Self-Defense Force
Wheeled self-propelled rocket launchers
Cold War weapons of Japan
Hino Motors vehicles